Proto-oncogene tyrosine-protein kinase FER is an enzyme that in humans is encoded by the FER gene.

Fer protein is a member of the FPS/FES family of nontransmembrane receptor tyrosine kinases. It regulates cell-cell adhesion and mediates signaling from the cell surface to the cytoskeleton via growth factor receptors.

Interactions
FER (gene) has been shown to interact with TMF1 and Cortactin.

References

Further reading

Tyrosine kinases